David Edward Wade (born 9 March 1950) is a former South Australian politician, who represented the Liberal Party for the Electoral district of Elder between 1993 and 1997.  He was elected to the South Australian House of Assembly as the inaugural Member for Elder during the 1993 State Election and stood for one term, until defeated at the 1997 State Election by Labor's Patrick Conlon.

References

1950 births
Living people
Members of the South Australian House of Assembly
Liberal Party of Australia members of the Parliament of South Australia